Hemnalini Memorial College of Engineering (HMCE), in Haringhata, West Bengal, India offers degree courses which are affiliated to West Bengal University of Technology (WBUT).

References

External links 

https://web.archive.org/web/20090619091259/http://www.wbut.net/

Universities and colleges in Nadia district
Colleges affiliated to West Bengal University of Technology
Educational institutions in India with year of establishment missing